Días de odio, literally translated as Days of Hate, is a 1954 Argentine film. It is based on the short story Emma Zunz by Jorge Luis Borges. Días de odio  was directed by Leopoldo Torre Nilsson and filmed in black and white. The script was adapted by Nilsson from the short story "Emma Zunz" by Jorge Luis Borges (first published in 1949). The film was released on 3 June 1954, starring Elisa Galvé, Nicolas Freguês, Raul del Valle, Enrique de Pedro, Duilio Marzio and Virginia Romay in the main roles. The producer of the film was Armando Bó.

Synopsis
Emma Zunz (played by Elisa Galve) is a young, lonely girl. One day she receives a letter communicating that her father, who had been imprisoned in Brazil, has committed suicide. Knowing that the businessman Plesner (played by Nicolás Fregues) is responsible for framing her father and ruining their family, Emma plans and executes her revenge.

Cast
Elisa Galvé as Emma Zunz
Nicolás Fregues as Plesner
Raúl del Valle as The Sailor
Enrique de Pedro as The Father

External links
 
Días de odio on "The Garden of Forking Paths" Borges site.

1954 films
1950s Spanish-language films
Argentine black-and-white films
Argentine crime drama films
1954 crime drama films
1950s Argentine films